Kosmos 111 ( meaning Cosmos 111), E-6S No.204, was the first Soviet attempt to orbit a spacecraft around the Moon. The design was similar to the future successful Luna 10 spacecraft. Kosmos 111 was produced in less than a month, one of two spacecraft developed from the E-6 lander bus in a crash program to upstage America's Lunar Orbiter series and to commemorate the 23rd Congress of the Communist Party of the Soviet Union (CPSU), held in March 1966.

Spacecraft
Kosmos 111 was designated an E-6S spacecraft, consisting of an E-6 bus attached to a cylindrical pressurized 245 kg lunar orbiter module. The main propulsion systems for lunar orbit insertion were on the bus, and the science payload was carried on the orbiter module. The payload comprised seven instruments: a gamma-ray spectrometer for energies between 0.3–3 MeV, a triaxial magnetometer (on the end of a 1.5-meter boom), a piezoelectric micrometeoroid detector, instruments for solar-plasma studies, devices for measuring infrared emissions from the Moon, low energy X-ray detectors, and a bank of charged particle detectors. Additionally, the radio system can be used for gravitational and radio occultation studies. The lunar orbiting module was battery-powered and communications were via 183 MHz and 922 MHz aerials.

Scientific instruments
Seven scientific instruments:

 Magnetometer
 Gamma-ray spectrometer
 Five gas-discharge counters
 Two ion traps and a charged particle trap
 Piezoelectric micrometer detector
 Infrared detector
 Low-energy X-ray photon counters

Mission
This mission was intended to orbit the Moon and was configured identically to the future Luna 10 mission (1966-027A). It was launched on 1 March 1966 at 11:03:49 GMT via Molniya 8K78M s/n U15000-50 rocket from Site 31/6 into Earth parking orbit, but the Blok-L upper stage lost roll control and failed to fire the spacecraft into a lunar trajectory. It was designated Kosmos 111 and reentered two days after launch, on 3 March 1966.

The official Soviet media named the stranded satellite Kosmos 111.

References

External links

 Zarya - Luna programme chronology

Luna programme
Kosmos satellites
Spacecraft launched in 1966
1966 in the Soviet Union